Take It All Away is the debut major-label studio album from American pop rock singer-songwriter Ryan Cabrera, and was released in 2004 on Atlantic Records. From this album, three singles were released; "On the Way Down", "True", and "40 Kinds of Sadness".

Track listing
"Let's Take Our Time" (Cabrera, Guy Chambers) 3:09
"On the Way Down" (Sabelle Breer, Cabrera, Curt Frasca) 3:33
"True" (Cabrera, Jimmy Harry, Shep Solomon) 3:24
"Exit To Exit" (Cabrera, Jimmy Harry, Solomon) 3:39
"40 Kinds of Sadness" (Breer, Cabrera, Frasca) 3:23
"Echo Park" (Cabrera, Jimmy Harry) 3:40
"Take It All Away" (Breer, Cabrera, Frasca) 3:46
"Shame On Me" (Cabrera, Steve Diamond, Savan Kotecha) 3:23
"She's" (Cabrera, Kara DioGuardi) 4:35
"Illusions" (Cabrera, John Rzeznik) 3:36
"Blind Sight" (Cabrera) 4:01
"On the Way Down" [Acoustic Version] 3:19

Japan Bonus Track
"I Know What It Feels Like"

Latin American Bonus track

13. "True" (Spanish Version) "Solo Me Faltas Tu"

Personnel
Musicians
 Ryan Cabrera – acoustic guitars and vocals
 Gregg Bissonette – drums and percussion
 Paul Bushnell – bass guitar
 Greg Suran – electric guitars
 John Rzeznik – additional guitar , background vocals 
 Raoul Shroff – saxophone 
 Rhett Hulcy – piano 
 Dan Chase – miscellaneous percussion

Production
 John Rzeznik – producer 
 Ryan Cabrera – co-producer , producer 
 Doug McKean – engineering and mixing  
 Craig David Smith – engineering and mixing  
 Darrell Thorp, Greg Burns, Brian Vibberts – assistant engineers
 Dan Chase – programming, editing, additional Pro Tools
 Eric Ferguson – additional Pro Tools
 Ted Jensen – mastering

Chart performance

References

2004 albums
Ryan Cabrera albums
Atlantic Records albums